Kuzminskoye is a rural locality (a village) in Zadneselskoye Rural Settlement, Ust-Kubinsky District, Vologda Oblast, Russia. The population was 3 as of 2002.

Geography 
Kuzminskoye is located 35 km north of Ustye (the district's administrative centre) by road. Kryukovo is the nearest rural locality.

References 

Rural localities in Ust-Kubinsky District